A total solar eclipse occurred on April 25, 1865. A solar eclipse occurs when the Moon passes between Earth and the Sun, thereby totally or partly obscuring the image of the Sun for a viewer on Earth. A total solar eclipse occurs when the Moon's apparent diameter is larger than the Sun's, blocking all direct sunlight, turning day into darkness. Totality occurs in a narrow path across Earth's surface, with the partial solar eclipse visible over a surrounding region thousands of kilometres wide.

Observations

Related eclipses

Saros 136

References

 NASA chart graphics
 Googlemap
 NASA Besselian elements
 

1865 04 25
1865 in science
1865 04 25
April 1865 events